The Paraíba do Meio River is a river in Alagoas state of northeastern Brazil. It flows southeast to empty into Manguaba Lagoon, an estuarine lake connected to the Atlantic Ocean by a network of channels.

See also
List of rivers of Alagoas

References

Rivers of Alagoas